The little pied flycatcher (Ficedula westermanni) is a species of bird in the family Muscicapidae. It is found in the Indian Subcontinent and Southeast Asia, ranging across Bangladesh, Bhutan, Cambodia, India, Indonesia, Laos, Malaysia, Myanmar, Nepal, the Philippines, Thailand, and Vietnam.

Its natural habitats are subtropical or tropical moist lowland forest and subtropical or tropical moist montane forest.

References

little pied flycatcher
Birds of North India
Birds of Nepal
Birds of Eastern Himalaya
Birds of Yunnan
Birds of Southeast Asia
little pied flycatcher
Taxonomy articles created by Polbot